Arthur Rankin (30 April 1904–1962) was a Scottish footballer who played in the Football League for Bristol City.

References

1904 births
1962 deaths
Scottish footballers
Association football forwards
English Football League players
Rutherglen Glencairn F.C. players
Clyde F.C. players
Dykehead F.C. players
Bristol City F.C. players
Charlton Athletic F.C. players
Yeovil Town F.C. players